Enantiophoenix is a genus of enantiornithine birds. Fossil remains were recovered from Lebanon. Lumps of amber preserved with one specimen indicate it may have fed on tree sap.

References

Prehistoric birds of Asia
Bird genera
Late Cretaceous birds of Asia
Avisaurids
Fossil taxa described in 2008
Fossils of Lebanon